Tim Novak (born 21 August 1997) is a Slovenian male canoeist who won a silver medal at senior level at the European Wildwater Championships.

References

External links
 

1997 births
Living people
Slovenian male canoeists
Place of birth missing (living people)